The Rodríguez-Vigil government was the regional government of Asturias led by President Juan Luis Rodríguez-Vigil. It was formed in July 1991 and ceased in June 1993 after the resignation of Rodríguez-Vigil due to the scandal of the Petromocho.

Investiture

Composition

References

Cabinets of Asturias
Cabinets established in 1991